Greek life at Georgia Tech includes over 50 active chapters of social fraternities and sororities. All of the groups are chapters of national organizations, including members of the North American Interfraternity Conference, National Panhellenic Conference, and National Pan-Hellenic Council. The first fraternity to establish a chapter at Georgia Tech was Alpha Tau Omega in 1888, before the school held its first classes. Most of the IFC and CPC organizations have houses on Georgia Tech's campus, generally on or near Fifth Street, Ferst Avenue, Fowler Street, or Techwood Drive, in the area known as the "Greek Sector." The first sorority to establish a chapter was Alpha Xi Delta in 1954. Students with Greek affiliation make up around 26 percent of the undergraduate student body.

Members of the Georgia Tech Interfraternity Council (IFC) 
There are currently 31 active member chapters of the Georgia Tech Interfraternity Council (IFC).

Notes
 The Beta Kappa chapter of Lambda Chi Alpha was suspended by the national organization effective February 2019 until 2024
 The Iota Mu chapter of Sigma Pi chose to dissolve itself May 2017 due to lack of membership.
 † One of numerous co-educational chapters of a nationally all-male fraternity.
 ‡ Only Christian chapter of a nationally nonsectarian fraternity.

Members of the Georgia Tech Collegiate Panhellenic Council (CPC)
There are currently 8 full and 2 associate members of the Georgia Tech Collegiate Panhellenic Council.

Notes
 Neither Alpha Delta Chi or Alpha Omega Epsilon are members of the National Panhellenic Conference, so therefore the Georgia Tech chapters of these organizations are classified as "Associate Members" of the Georgia Tech Collegiate Panhellenic Council.

Members of the Georgia Tech Pan-Hellenic Conference (NPHC)
Georgia Tech is home to chapters representing eight of the nine members of the National Pan-Hellenic Council, an organization of Historically African-American fraternities and sororities, also known as Black Greek-Letter Organizations, or BGLOs.

Fraternities

Sororities

Members of the Georgia Tech Multicultural Greek Council (MGC)
Georgia Tech's Multicultural Greek Council is composed of seven culturally-oriented fraternities and sororities.

Fraternities

Sororities

References

External links

 Georgia Tech Office of Greek Affairs
 Georgia Tech Interfraternity Council
 Georgia Tech Collegiate Panhellenic Council
 Georgia Tech National Pan-Hellenic Council
 Georgia Tech Multicultural Greek Council

Georgia Institute of Technology
Fraternities and Sororities